Igal may refer to:

 Igal (biblical figure), son of Joseph of Issachar
 Igal, Hungary, a town in Hungary
 Igal, Navarre, a town in Salazar Valley, Spain
 Agal (accessory), an accessory to secure a keffiyeh or headcloth

See also
 Igala (disambiguation)
 Yigal (disambiguation), the Hebraicized form of Igal